Manuden is a village and civil parish in the Uttlesford district of Essex, England. The village has its own parish council.

Manuden is mentioned in the Domesday Book of 1086 as one of the settlements within Clavering hundred.

Part of Manuden is designated as a conservation area, with several listed buildings in and around the village.

The local church is St Mary the Virgin. A tablet within the church commemorates the Jacobean statesman and diplomat William Wade, who spent his retirement at Battles Hall in the village, and is buried in the church.

There is a primary school in the village. In 2010, Manuden County Primary School topped the league table for English schools at KS2 with all pupils attaining level 5 in both English and maths.

There are several active village organisations, including a local history society, junior football club and a cricket club.

See also
 The Hundred Parishes

References

External links

Villages in Essex
Uttlesford